Sir Philip Christopher Ondaatje, OC, CBE, FRSL (born 22 February 1933) is a Sri Lankan-born Canadian–English businessman, philanthropist, adventurer, writer and bob-sledding Olympian for Canada. Ondaatje is the older brother of the author Michael Ondaatje and lives in both Chester, Nova Scotia, and the United Kingdom.

Overview

Born in Ceylon (now Sri Lanka) to a Chetty-Burgher family of Dutch and Indian origin, Ondaatje first went to S. Thomas' Preparatory School in Kollupitiya as one of its first students, and later went to Blundell's School in the United Kingdom. His name comes from an Indian ancestor called Ondaatchi from Thanjavur, India. After his alcoholic father lost the family fortune, Ondaatje had to leave school a year from graduation. In 1956, he emigrated to Canada, arriving in Toronto with virtually no money. He quickly began to rebuild the family fortune, becoming a wealthy stockbroker, going on to be one of the three founding members of Loewen Ondaatje McCutcheon. He became a multi-millionaire in the publishing industry by founding the Pagurian Press, which he later sold to the Bronfman family. 

He represented Canada in the four-man bobsled at the 1964 Winter Olympics in Innsbruck. Although the first Canadian men's team won gold in the event, Ondaatje's team finished 14th out of 18 teams. He is a member of the Chester Yacht Club in Nova Scotia, where he owns an island with a view of Chester Harbour.

Philanthropy

Ondaatje is a prominent philanthropist; among the institutions he has helped are: The National Portrait Gallery, The Royal Geographical Society, The Royal Canadian Geographical Society, Somerset County Cricket Club, Blundell's School, The Sir Christopher Ondaatje Devon Cricket Centre at Exeter University, Lakefield College School, Dalhousie University, the National Ballet School, the Royal Ontario Museum (the Sir Christopher Ondaatje South Asian Gallery), Massey College in the University of Toronto, Lester B. Pearson United World College of the Pacific, the Art Gallery of Nova Scotia and the Chester Playhouse.

The Royal Society of Literature's Ondaatje Prize is named after Ondaatje, as is the Ondaatje Prize for Portraiture from the Royal Society of Portrait Painters.

Political donations

In 2000 Ondaatje donated £2 million to the UK Labour Party.

Adventurer

After many years of success, in which Ondaatje was considered one of Toronto's most aggressive and predatory businessmen, he left the business world in 1995.  He moved to Britain and began a career as a philanthropist and adventurer.  Travelling through India and Africa, he also became an author, following in the footsteps of his younger brother Michael Ondaatje, a novelist. His books describe his travels and adventures. 

His 2003 book Hemingway in Africa details his thesis regarding the life and motivations of Ernest Hemingway.

Honours
Ondaatje was made a Knight Bachelor by the Queen in 2003 in her 2003 Birthday Honours for his philanthropy and charitable services to Museums, Galleries and Societies. He had previously been made a Commander of the Order of the British Empire in the 2000 Birthday Honours, and is an Officer of the Order of Canada and a Senior Fellow of Massey College.

He was elected an Honorary Fellow of The Royal Society of Literature in 2003.

In 2011, he was made an Honorary Fellow of The Royal Canadian Geographical Society (RCGS) and was awarded its Gold Medal. In 2013, the RCGS established a medal in his name – the Sir Christopher Ondaatje Medal for Exploration — which is awarded annually to outstanding Canadian explorers.

Publications
 Olympic Victory: The story behind the Canadian Bob-Sled Club's incredible victory at the 1964 Winter Olympic Games (1967)
 The Prime Ministers of Canada, 1867–1967 (1968)
 Leopard in the Afternoon — An Africa Tenting Safari (1989)
 The Man-eater of Punanai — a Journey of Discovery to the Jungles of Old Ceylon (1992)
 Sindh Revisited: A Journey in the Footsteps of Captain Sir Richard Francis Burton (1996)
 Journey to the Source of the Nile (1999)
 Hemingway in Africa: The Last Safari (2004)
 Woolf in Ceylon: An Imperial Journey in the Shadow of Leonard Woolf, 1904–1911 (2005)
 The Power of Paper: A History, a Financial Adventure and a Warning (2007)
 The Glenthorne Cat and other amazing leopard stories (2008)
 The Last Colonial: Curious Adventures & Stories from a Vanishing World (2011)

See also
 Ondaatje Letters
 Michael Ondaatje
 Ondaatje Prize
 Pearl Ondaatje

References

Further reading
  Reviews Love duet ....

External links
Order of Canada Citation
Author website
HarperCollins Canada site
History of Chester Playhouse

1933 births
Bobsledders at the 1964 Winter Olympics
British philanthropists
Burgher sportspeople
Burgher writers
Canadian businesspeople
Canadian Knights Bachelor
Canadian non-fiction writers
Canadian people of Dutch descent
Canadian people of Tamil descent
Canadian philanthropists
Canadian sportspeople of Sri Lankan descent
Ceylonese knights
Commanders of the Order of the British Empire
Fellows of the Royal Society of Literature
Knights Bachelor
Labour Party (UK) people
Living people
Officers of the Order of Canada
Olympic bobsledders of Canada
Christopher
People educated at Blundell's School
People from Kandy
People from British Ceylon
Royal Canadian Geographical Society fellows
Sri Lankan businesspeople
Sri Lankan emigrants to Canada
Canadian male bobsledders
Indian Tamil businesspeople of Sri Lanka